İnşaatçı Baku FK was an Azerbaijani football club from Baku founded in 1935, as Stroitel Baku, changing their name to İnşaatçı Baku in 1992 before dissolving in 1995.

They participated in the Azerbaijan Top Division from 1992 to the 1994–95 season. They were also the first winners of the Azerbaijan Cup in 1992.

Honours
Azerbaijan Cup
 Winners (1): 1992

League and domestic cup history

References 

Insaatci Baku
Association football clubs established in 1985
Defunct football clubs in Azerbaijan
1985 establishments in the Soviet Union